Ernesto Lacayo (born May 5, 1989) is an American football placekicker for the Duke City Gladiators of the Indoor Football League (IFL).

Early life
He played high school football at Tennyson High School in Hayward, California, where he holds numerous kicking records. He played college football at Hastings College (NAIA), where he holds all kicking records in Hastings College history.

Professional career
Ernesto went undrafted in the 2011 NFL Draft and signed with the Nebraska Danger (IFL) after the draft. After one year with the Danger, Ernesto then signed with the Louisiana Swashbucklers (PIFL) 2013. After the Swashbucklers folded in 2013, Lacayo then signed with the Wichita Wild (CPIFL) in 2014. Lacayo set an All-Arena/Indoor record of 30 field goals made in a season, and kicked a CPIFL record 55-yard field goal against the Salina Bombers. Lacayo also kicked a 51-yard game-winning field goal against the Dodge City Law to put the Wild in the CPIFL Championship. 

In 2014, Ernesto then signed with the Wichita Force (CIF) for the 2015 season, where he played only 10 games before being called up to play for the Las Vegas Outlaws (arena football) (AFL) in 2015. In 11 games with the Outlaws, Lacayo led the league point after touchdown (PAT) percentage connecting on 54-of-59 (91.5%). In 2016, Lacayo signed with the Portland Steel (AFL). 

Lacayo signed with the Seattle Dragons of the XFL in February 2020. He had his contract terminated when the league suspended operations on April 10, 2020.

In spring 2021, Lacayo signed with the Arizona Rattlers for their 2021 season. Lacayo was named to the 2021 All-IFL Second Team after he finished the regular season completing 85 of 93 PAT attempts and 6 of 10 field goals for the Rattlers.

On December 3, 2022, Lacayo signed with the Duke City Gladiators of the Indoor Football League (IFL).

References

External links
Ernesto Lacayo profile at ArenaFootball.com
XFL stats

1989 births
American football placekickers
American football punters
Hastings Broncos football players
Las Vegas Outlaws (arena football) players
Living people
Nebraska Danger players
Portland Steel players
Players of American football from California
Sportspeople from Hayward, California
Wichita Force players
Wichita Wild players
Louisiana Swashbucklers players
Seattle Dragons players